Gandaulim is a village located on the western bank of the Cumbarjua Canal, within Ilhas in the state of Goa, India. Residents of the village and of Dubrovnik, Croatia believe that it was a colonial outpost of the Republic of Ragusa although there is no historical evidence in support of this theory.

History 
Gandaulim might have been a spice trading post of the Republic of Ragusa in the Middle Ages. 

In the annals of 1605, Jakov Lukarević noted that Ragusan merchants invested in decorating a local church. Portuguese traveler Gomes Catão documented the town to have a population of 12,000, where wealthy ladies were carried to the churches by slaves in canopies. Catão also remarked the church to be modeled on an eponymous church of Dubrovnik. These claims have since made to the popular memory of inhabitants of Gandaulim and Ragusans are now credited for the very construction of the church; however, the factual accuracy remains disputed.

Some historians have used these arguments to make questionable assumptions about the existence of a Ragusan colony. Serbian economic historian Nicholas Mirkovich had lamented in 1943 about the lack of contemporary Ragusan sources to draft a history of their exploits in India.

Interest in the connection was revived in 1999, when Croatian Indologist Zdravka Matišić discovered a reference to ties between Ragusa and Goa by chance while studying Sanskrit texts in India. That same year, Croatian author Karmen Bašić noted that while nothing definitive could be said about Ragusan arrival and departure from Goa, there was a "substantial body of evidence and sources vouching for Ragusa’s presence" and its role in the global spice trade, though the notion of a colony linked to the Saint Blaise (São Brás) church at Gandaulim remained "somewhat of a mystery".

Infrastructure

In 2016, a bridge was constructed on the outskirts of the village, over the canal. This bridge now links the islands of Ilhas de Goa to Cumbarjua.

Gallery 
Gandaulim was a site of a historical fortress, which was demolished in the early 21st century for a road expansion project.

Notes

References

Villages in North Goa district
Portuguese India